Trichopoda pennipes is a species of feather-legged fly in the dipteran family Tachinidae.

Distribution
This species is native to North America (United States, Mexico), Hawaiian Islands and South America and has been introduced into southern Europe (France, Italy and Spain).

Habitat
This species inhabits grasslands, hedge rows and crops where its key hosts are present.

Morphology

These medium-sized flies have a velvety, black head. The black or brown thorax shows a few yellow stripes. Eyes are large, brown with yellow between. The color of the slender abdomen varies from bright orange to completely black. Females usually have a dark-tipped abdomen, while males have a dark orange apex. Wings are transparent, smoky with prominent veins. In the females they are evenly dusky, with the posterior margin sub-hyaline. Male flies have a ferrugineous marking on the wings. This fly has huge halteres. Legs are black, with yellow feet. The hind legs bear a prominent feather-like fringe of flattened hairs.

Life cycle
Trichopoda pennipes first appears in the late spring or early summer and feeds on nectar sucked from flowers such as Queen Anne's lace and meadowsweet. It may be seen hovering over other plants in search of suitable bugs on which to lay its eggs, most commonly squash bugs and southern green stinkbugs. The female fly lays several small, pale-coloured, oval eggs on a large nymph or an adult bug. In fact the larvae are parasitoids of several true bugs, particularly squash bugs and leaf-footed bugs in the family Coreidae (including the large-sized Leptoglossus occidentalis), stinkbugs in the family Pentatomidae and other pentatomorph bugs (Largidae and Scutelleridae species).

When the eggs hatch, the larvae burrow into the bug. If there are several larvae in one host, only one survives. After feeding on the bug's tissues, the cream-coloured larva emerges and falls to the ground where it pupates in a reddish-brown puparium formed from the last larval skin. The bug meanwhile dies. After about two weeks, an adult fly emerges from the pupa. After mating, a female fly may lay several hundred eggs in total. There are up to three generations of the fly each year and the parasitoid overwinters as a second instar larva within the body of the overwintering host.

Use in biological control
Trichopoda pennipes is used as a biological control agent for agricultural pests. One of the principal host species for T. pennipes is the southern green stinkbug, Nezara viridula. This is a crop pest that originated in Ethiopia but now has a worldwide distribution and is named for the foul-smelling defensive secretion it exudes from a gland on its thorax. This exudate appears to be fairly effective in preventing predation by birds but is well tolerated by T. pennipes which seems to be highly attracted by an aggregation pheromone produced by the male bugs. This results in a higher proportion of males being parasitised than females.

There seem to be different biotypes across the United States, preying on different hosts in different regions. In northern California, a population of the fly parasitised the bordered plant bug, Largus succinctus, but did not attack the squash bug, Anasa tristis. In an experiment, T. pennipes was collected from squash fields in New York State and released near squash fields in California. The insects targeted the squash bugs and established permanent populations. Their eggs are now found deposited on nearly 50% of the squash bugs in the area but it is unclear how effective this is in controlling the crop pests. On the southern green stink bug, the rate of parasitism can be as high as 93% and up to 80% on the squash bug. However, T. pennipes does not prevent all crop damage as the bugs continue to feed and reproduce after being parasitised, though the reproductive organs begin to atrophy when the parasitoid reaches the second instar stage. Control of the pest is more effective when nymphs are parasitised since half of these die before becoming adults and any that overwinter will die before laying eggs.

Gallery

References

Phasiinae
Insects used as insect pest control agents
Muscomorph flies of Europe
Diptera of North America
Diptera of South America
Insects described in 1781